League Tables for teams participating in Kakkonen, the third tier of the Finnish Soccer League system, in 2001.

League Tables 2001

Southern Group, Etelälohko

Eastern Group, Itälohko

Western Group, Länsilohko

Northern Group, Pohjoislohko

Promotion Playoffs

Koparit – Ponnistus 2–2
Ponnistus – Koparit 0–0
GBK – PP-70 1–3
PP-70 – GBK 1–0
Koparit – IF Gnistan 0–2
IF Gnistan – Koparit 4–2

IF Gnistan retain their place in the Ykkönen.

PP-70 – FC Mikkeli 1–0
FC Mikkeli – PP-70 2–1

PP-70 are promoted to Ykkönen.

Leading goal scorers

Etelälohko

22 - Peter Lundberg IFK Mariehamn
20 - Vjatšeslav Malakejev FC Viikingit
15 - Janne Mäkitalo JäPS

Itälohko

19 - Tommi Keveri FC KooTeePee
18 - Kim Liljeqvist FC KooTeePee
14 - Mikko Pantsu Koparit, Tero Tahvanainen Ratanat

Länsilohko

17 - Claes-Johan Siegfrids KaIK
14 - Matti Heimo VG-62, Jouni Santanen KaIK
12 - Petri Merisaari KaaPo

Pohjoislohko

16 - Alexander Andraschuk JBK
15 - Jussi Roiko GBK
13 - Pekka Kainu KPV-j

Footnotes

References and sources
Finnish FA, Suomen Palloliitto 
Kakkonen 

Kakkonen seasons
3
Fin
Fin